Erik Levin (November 30, 1899 in Gothenburg, Sweden – October 19, 1960 in New York City) was a Swedish football (soccer) full back who played professionally in Sweden and the United States.  He earned two caps with the Swedish national team.

Levin played for IFK Göteborg in the Swedish Allsvenskan from 1919 to 1923.  In 1924, he signed with Indiana Flooring of the American Soccer League.  On December 6, 1925, Levin traded to Bethlehem Steel in exchange for Davey Ferguson.  In 1928, he joined the New York Nationals before leaving the team and league for good following the 1929 fall season.

Levin also earned two caps with the Swedish national team.

References

1899 births
1960 deaths
Swedish footballers
American Soccer League (1921–1933) players
Bethlehem Steel F.C. (1907–1930) players
IFK Göteborg players
Indiana Flooring players
New York Nationals (ASL) players
Swedish emigrants to the United States
Sweden international footballers
Association football defenders
Footballers from Gothenburg